Scusi, facciamo l'amore? (internationally released as Listen, Let's Make Love) is a 1969 Italian commedia all'italiana written and directed by Vittorio Caprioli.

Plot 
Lallo di San Marciano moves from Naples to Milan after the death of his father Bebe. Because the father did not own anything, except a series of elegant dresses, Lallo is welcomed into the home of his uncle Carlo.
Lallo begins attending the wealthy friends of his aunt, with whom he starts a series of sexual relations in order to be kept.

Cast 
 Pierre Clémenti: Lallo di San Marciano
 Claudine Auger: Ida Bernasconi
 Beba Lončar: Lidia
 Carlo Caprioli: Carlo
 Valentina Cortese: Mrs. di San Marciano	
 Massimo Girotti: Tassi
 Franca Valeri: Diraghi
 Edwige Feuillère: Giuditta
 Juliette Mayniel: Gilberta
 Tanya Lopert: Flavia
 Fabienne Fabre: Puccio Picco 
 Martine Malle: Sveva

References

External links

1969 films
Commedia all'italiana
Films set in Milan
1969 comedy films
Films directed by Vittorio Caprioli
Films scored by Ennio Morricone
Films produced by Alberto Grimaldi
1960s Italian-language films
1960s Italian films